The Senate of Puerto Rico majority and minority leaders are Puerto Rican Senators who are elected by the party conferences that hold the majority and the minorities respectively.  These leaders serve as the chief Senate spokespeople for their parties and manage and schedule the legislative and executive business of the Senate. By rule, the Presiding Officer gives the Majority Leader priority in obtaining recognition to speak on the floor of the Senate. The Majority Leader customarily serves as the chief representative of his or her party in Senate.

Current floor leaders
The Senate is currently composed of 12 senators from the Popular Democratic Party (PPD), 10 senators from the New Progressive Party (PNP), 2 senators from Movimiento Victoria Ciudadana (MVC), 1 senator from the Puerto Rican Independence Party (PIP), 1 senator of Proyecto Dignidad (PD) and 1 independent senator.

The incumbent floor leaders are PPD Majority Leader Javier Aponte Dalmau, PNP Minority Leader Thomas Rivera Schatz.

List of party leaders
The "Majority" column indicates which party was the majority in the Senate, while the opposing column indicates the minority. The PIP is usually a minority.

See also

 Assistant party leaders of the Senate of Puerto Rico

References

Officers of the Senate of Puerto Rico
P